Kabile Manor is a  manor house located in Kuldīga Municipality, Kabile Parish, in the historical region of Courland, in western Latvia.

History 
Built in Baroque style between 1734 and 1740 for Eleonora von Behr,  it was remodeled in the 1860s. Unique 18th century interiors of manor has been preserved. Vaulted cellars of Kabile Manor has been storing wine since manor house has been built. Now manor has fully operational cidery and winery.

See also
List of castles in Latvia

References

Manor houses in Latvia
Baroque architecture in Latvia
Kuldīga Municipality
Wineries of Latvia